The 1914 Detroit Tigers season was a season in American baseball. It involved the Detroit Tigers finishing fourth in the American League.

Ty Cobb won another batting title with a .368 average. Sam Crawford led the league in RBI and was second in MVP voting.

Regular season

Season standings

Record vs. opponents

Roster

Player stats

Batting

Starters by position 
Note: Pos = Position; G = Games played; AB = At bats; H = Hits; Avg. = Batting average; HR = Home runs; RBI = Runs batted in

Other batters 
Note: G = Games played; AB = At bats; H = Hits; Avg. = Batting average; HR = Home runs; RBI = Runs batted in

Pitching

Starting pitchers 
Note: G = Games pitched; IP = Innings pitched; W = Wins; L = Losses; ERA = Earned run average; SO = Strikeouts

Other pitchers 
Note: G = Games pitched; IP = Innings pitched; W = Wins; L = Losses; ERA = Earned run average; SO = Strikeouts

Awards and honors

League top five finishers 
Donie Bush
 #4 in AL in runs scored (97)

Ty Cobb
 MLB leader in on-base percentage (.466)
 AL leader in batting average (.368)
 AL leader in slugging percentage (.513)

Harry Coveleski
 #2 in AL in wins (22)

Sam Crawford
 AL leader in RBI (104)
 #3 in AL in slugging percentage (.483)

References 

1914 Detroit Tigers season at Baseball Reference

Detroit Tigers seasons
Detroit Tigers season
Detroit Tigers
1914 in Detroit